Empress Fu may refer to:

Empress Fu (Ai) (died 1 BC), empress of Emperor Ai of Han (Liu Xin)
Fu Shou (died 214), empress of Emperor Xian of Han (Liu Xie)
Queen Fu ( 394), wife of Qifu Gangui, ruler of Western Qin
Fu Xunying (died 407), empress of Murong Xi (Emperor Zhaowen of Later Yan)
Empress Fu the Elder (931–956), first empress of Chai Rong (Guo Rong, Emperor Shizong of Later Zhou)
Empress Dowager Fu (Later Zhou) (died 993), second empress of Emperor Shizong of Later Zhou, Empress Fu the Elder's younger sister

Posthumous empresses
Fu Song'e (died 404), Fu Xunying's elder sister and Murong Xi's consort
Princess Fu (Song dynasty) (941–975), sister of Empress Fu the Elder and Empress Dowager Fu (Later Zhou), Emperor Taizong of Song's first wife

See also
Empress Dowager Fu (disambiguation)
Fu (surname)

Fu